Clarks Hill or Clark Hill can refer to some places in the United States:

Clarks Hill, Indiana
Clark Hill (Oneida County, New York)
Clarks Hill, South Carolina
Lake Strom Thurmond, formerly known as Clarks Hill Reservoir